Pekka Jormakka (born September 14, 1990) is a Finnish professional ice hockey player who is currently playing for Mikkelin Jukurit of the Finnish Liiga.

Playing career
He has previously played in the top level Finnish Liiga with JYP Jyväskylä, Lahti Pelicans and Tappara. He gained fame in Finland during the 2018 IIHF World Championships as being the only playing Finnish forward that failed to score any points, despite the other forwards scoring a combined 77 points as of May 17, 2018. This caused many to question Finland's head coach for having Jormakka play power play.

Career statistics

Regular season and playoffs

International

References

External links

1990 births
Finnish ice hockey forwards
Grizzlys Wolfsburg players
Jokerit players
JYP Jyväskylä players
Living people
Lahti Pelicans players
Mikkelin Jukurit players
HC Sibir Novosibirsk players
Tappara players
HC Vityaz players